Ödeshög Municipality (Ödeshögs kommun) is a municipality in Östergötland County, Sweden. The seat is situated in the small town of Ödeshög.

The coat of arms was created in 1972 at the time the modern municipalities of Sweden were created. It mainly represents the medieval monastery of Alvastra: An abbacy staff, a rising moon (historically representing the Virgin Mary), and a six-pointed star (representing a higher deity).

Nature
A large part of the municipality borders lake Vättern. There is a small harbour.

There are two nature reserves within the municipal borders: Isberga with a distinguished steppe meadow flora , and Kråkeryd located on rocks above Vättern at 60 meters altitude. Kråkeryd has a geology rich in lime, and the uncultivated rocky terrain is the location for several unusual flowers and plants .

Localities
There are two urban areas (also called a Tätort or locality) in Ödeshög Municipality.

In the table the localities are listed according to the size of the population as of December 31, 2005. The municipal seat is in bold characters.

Sights

Within the borders of the municipalities lies the monastery of Alvastra. One of the world's most famous runestones, the Rök runestone, is also situated within the municipal borders.

There are also other ancient remains: the two hillforts Borgberget and Hjässaborgen. Both are open for visits although not much remains, and both are somewhat difficult to access. The municipality also contains burial grounds, etc.

Besides the monastery of Alvastra, there are seven other notable churches, several of which have a medieval foundation. Noteworthy are: Rök Church from 1845 (outside which stands the Rök runestone), Stora Åby Church, from the 1750s, with several older artifacts (baptismal font, triptych), and Ödeshögs Church with a medieval foundation.

In Eketorp, an ancient Thor's hammer amulet was found.

Famous citizens
Klas Ingesson, former Sheffield Wednesday and PSV Eindhoven footballer
Helen Svensson Fletre (1909–1987), American author and journalist

Twin towns
 Obol, Belarus

References
Statistics Sweden

External links

Ödeshög Municipality - Official site
Welcome to Ödeshög - Official tourism page, Swedish/English/German

Municipalities of Östergötland County